Joy Padak (Bengali: জয় পদক), is a military medal of Bangladesh. The medal is awarded for victory in the 1971 War of Independence. It is intended to be awarded to members of the armed forces participating in the war of liberation against Pakistan members of the armed forces participating in the war of liberation against Pakistan.

References 

Military awards and decorations of Bangladesh